AXIS Flight Training Systems GmbH supplies EASA- and FAA-compliant flight training equipment, from flat panel trainers to full flight simulators. It was founded in 2004 in Graz/Austria. Their first design was a level D full flight simulator. In 2005 they produced a level D full flight simulator with an Equipe collimated visual system and a Rexroth hydraulic motion base. 

They currently manufacture full flight simulators and flight training devices for all types and configurations of aircraft, including business jets, turboprop commuters and passenger jetliners.

In 2010 their engineering and production departments moved to a new facility in Lebring.

References

External links
 Official site

Aerospace companies
Austrian companies established in 2004
Aviation in Austria
Manufacturing companies established in 2004